Elaeocarpus recurvatus is a species of flowering plant in the Elaeocarpaceae family. It is found only in India. It is threatened by habitat loss.

References

recurvatus
Endemic flora of India (region)
Vulnerable plants
Taxonomy articles created by Polbot
Taxa named by E. J. H. Corner